Stadion Z'dežele is a football stadium in Celje, Slovenia. It is the home ground of NK Celje since 2003. Prior July 2017, the stadium was named Arena Petrol.

At the time of its opening, Arena Petrol was the most modern football stadium in the country. It took its name from its principal sponsor, the Slovenian oil company Petrol. The stadium opened on 9 September 2003 with its single stand giving it a capacity of 3,600. During the next years three additional stands were built until the stadium was completed in 2008 with the capacity of 13,059 seats; 7,000 of which are covered. The pitch in the stadium is 105 metres long and 68 metres wide and covered with natural grass. The stadium also features a pitch heating system and floodlighting.

In 2004, the stadium replaced the Bežigrad Stadium as the venue for all competitive home matches of the Slovenian national football team. In 2003 it replaced the former stadium of Celje, Skalna Klet, which now serves as a training facility for members of the first team.

Stands
Main stand (3,600 seats)
West stand (4,850 seats)
North stand (3,000 seats)
South stand (1,500 seats)

National team matches

See also
List of football stadiums in Slovenia

References

External links
Stadion Z'dežele on Football Stadiums of Slovenia 

NK Celje
Football venues in Slovenia
Sports venues completed in 2003
Multi-purpose stadiums in Slovenia
Sport in Celje
Buildings and structures in Celje
2003 establishments in Slovenia
21st-century architecture in Slovenia